Victor Francen (born Victor Franssens; 5 August 1888 – 18 November 1977) was a Belgian-born actor with a long career in French cinema and in Hollywood.

Biography
Francen was born in 1888 in Tienen, the son of a chief of police. 

According to Russian sources, he attended opera classes in Odessa before 1914.
Was already well known in Russian empire before 1914. Postcards with his portraits were printed and sold.

He worked in trade in Belgium before settling in Paris where he trained in dramatic art under Paul Mounet. His stage career in the 1920s included appearances in plays by Henri Bernstein, Georges Bataille and Edmond Rostand which took him all over the world. After three appearances in silent films, he played the Prophet in Abel Gance's film  La Fin du monde (The End of the World) (1931) and established his career as a leading man in French films.

In 1940, he was introduced to American films by Charles Boyer and appeared in Hold Back the Dawn (1941), The Tuttles of Tahiti (1942), Ten Gentlemen from West Point (1942), Tales of Manhattan (1942),  Mission to Moscow (1943), Madame Curie (1943), The Desert Song (1943), In Our Time (1944),  Passage to Marseille (1944), The Mask of Dimitrios (1944), The Conspirators (1944), Confidential Agent (1945), San Antonio (1945), Devotion (1946), Night and Day (1946), The Beast with Five Fingers (1946), The Beginning or the End (1947),  To the Victor (1948), Hell and High Water (1954).

He was married three times, his last marriage to the actress  Mary Marquet. He died in 1977 in Saint-Cannat, Bouches-du-Rhône, France.

Complete filmography

 Le doute (1921) – Le jeune écrivain Pierre Aubry
 Crépuscule d'épouvante (1921) – Michel Fortin
 La neige sur les pas (1923) – Marc Romenay
 La Fin du monde (End of the World) (1931) – Martial Novalic
 L'aiglon (The Eaglet) (1931) – Flambeau
 Après l'amour (When Love Is Over) (1931) – Pierre Meyran
 Ariane, jeune fille russe (1932) – Constantin
 Mélo (The Dreamy Mouth) (1932) – Marcel, l'amant
 Les ailes brisées (1933) – Fabrège
 Le velour (1933) – Richard Voisin
 L'Aventurier (1934) – Étienne Ranson
 Le chemineau (1935) – Le chemineau / The Vagabond
 Veille d'armes (1935) – Captain de Corlaix
 La porte du large (1936) – Commandant Villette
 Le roi (The King) (1936) – Le roi Jean IV de Cerdagne – en visite à Paris
 Nuits de feu (Nights of Fire) (1937) – Fedor Andreiev
 L'appel de la vie (The Call of Life) (1937) – Le professeur Rougeon
 Double crime sur la ligne Maginot (Double Crime in the Maginot Line) (1937) – Capitaine Bruchot
 Feu! (1937) – André Frémiet
 Forfaiture (The Cheat) (1937) – Pierre Moret
 J'accuse! (1938) – Jean Diaz
 Tamara la complaisante (1938) – Grigory
 La vierge folle (The Foolish Virgin) (1938) – Marcel Armaury
 La fin du jour (The End of the Day) (1939) – Marny
 Entente cordiale (1939) – Le roi Édouard VII
 L'homme du Niger (The Man from Niger) (1940) – Le commandant Bréval
 Hold Back the Dawn (1941) – Van Den Luecken
 The Tuttles of Tahiti (1942) – Dr. Blondin
 Ten Gentlemen from West Point (1942) – Florimond Massey
 Tales of Manhattan (1942) – Arturo Bellini
 Mission to Moscow (1943) – Vyshinsky, chief trial prosecutor
 Madame Curie (1943) – President of University
 The Desert Song (1943) – Caid Yousseff
 In Our Time (1944) – Count Pawel Orwid
 Passage to Marseille (1944) – Capt. Patain Malo
 The Mask of Dimitrios (1944) – Wladislaw Grudek
 The Conspirators (1944) – Hugo Von Mohr
 Hollywood Canteen (1944) – Victor Francen
 Confidential Agent (1945) – Licata
 San Antonio (1945) – Legare
 Devotion (1946) – Constantin Heger
 Night and Day (1946) – Anatole Giron
 The Beast with Five Fingers (1946) – Francis Ingram
 The Beginning or the End (1947) – Dr. Marré
 To the Victor (1948) – Police Inspector Beauvais
 La Révoltée (1948) – Henri Dumières
 La nuit s'achève (1950) – Dr. Coudray (Thiriot)
 Adventures of Captain Fabian (1951) – Henri Brissac
 Hell and High Water (1954) – Prof. Montel
 Bedevilled (1955) – Father Du Rocher
 A Farewell to Arms (1957) – Colonel Valentini
 The Indian Tomb (1959) – Penitent (uncredited)
 Journey to the Lost City (1960)
 Fanny (1961) – Panisse's Elder Brother
 The Big Scare (1964) – Docteur Chabert
 Top Crack (1966) – (final film role)

External links
 
 

1888 births
1977 deaths
20th-century Belgian male actors
Belgian expatriates in France
Belgian expatriates in the United States
Belgian male film actors
Belgian male silent film actors
Belgian male stage actors
Expatriate male actors in the United States
People from Tienen